Orophia imbutella is a moth in the family Depressariidae. It was described by Hugo Theodor Christoph in 1888. It is found in Georgia.

References

Moths described in 1888
Orophia